Marconi Ferreira Perillo Júnior (born in Goiânia, March 7, 1963) is a Brazilian politician, affiliate to the Brazilian Social Democracy Party (PSDB). He is the former governor of the state of Goiás (1999–2002; 2003–2006; 2011–2018).

Biography 
Marconi Ferreira Perillo Júnior was born in Goiânia, in the maternity Maternidade de Maio, on March 7, 1963, but was raised in Palmeiras de Goiás, where he consider his hometown. First born son of the merchant Marconi Ferreira Perillo and the housewife Maria Pires Perillo, he has also three other siblings: Antônio, Vânia and Tatiana.

He went to Elementary School in the Public School of Palmeira de Goiás (1970–1978).  At age 14 he had his first formal job, as a helper on the 2º Ofício de Notas em Palmeiras notary’s Office.

At the age of 15, he went live with his uncle Jorge e Maria Conceição, in the city of Goiânia, to keep studying.
  
In Goiânia, he went to high school in Pré-Médico College (1978–1980). In the capital, he made friends in the artistic and intellectual scene, as with Nars Chaul, Bororó, João Caetano, and others, due to his closeness to his cousin Fernando Perillo, who is a MPB singer.

In 1980 he was approved in the Universidade Federal de Goiás to the course of Social Science. In 1982 he was approved in the Universidade Brás Cubas, at Mogi das Cruzes (SP) to the course of Industrial engineer. In 1985, got a spot on UCG Law School.

Marconi even started the courses that he was approved but he abandoned them because of his work and his political involvement.

It was on the Legislature that he met Valéria Jaime Peixoto, whom he married in 1989 and had two daughters, Isabela and Ana Luísa.

He finished law school in 2010 at Faculdade Alves Faria.

Political trajectory 
Marconi Perillo started his political career in the political party Partido do Movimento Democrático Brasileiro (PMDB). And in two opportunities he was the leader on the young division of his political party, PMDB Jovem (1985–1987 and 1987–1989), in this period his also worked as a member for the state directory . He was the personal assistant to Goias governor Henrique Santillo in 1987 till 1991 and as State Deputy in 1991 till 1995.

In 1992, Perillo and Santillo, with other leaders from PMDB, join another political party called Partido Social Trabalhista (PST), until 1993, when the political party PST with other political party named Partido Trabalhista Renovador (PTR) formalized a union, creating a new political party called Partido Progressista (PP). In 1994, Perillo is elected Federal Deputy for PP, being the 6th most voted.

In 1998, Perillo was elected governor for the political party Partido da Social Democracia Brasileira (PSDB) at age 35, becoming the youngest state governor in Brazil. In this election, the polls indicated a great favoritism to the ex-governor and then senator Iris Rezende, former political party colleague with Perillo, and that time main political leader. With the slogan “Tempo novo” (New Times) for the political scenario, Perillo unexpectedly defeated Iris on the elections second round and then claimed the state governor of Goiás, being reelected in 2002 in the first round. In 2006 didn’t finish his mandate, to run as a senator. He was elected with 75% of the votes and contributed to the election of this successor, his vice governor Alcides Rodrigues to the state governor spot.

2010 elections 
On October 3, 2010 he received 1,400,227 votes (46,33% of valid votes), making him able to run second round against Iris Rezende of PMDB in October 31 of the same year, then he was elected state governor of Goiás for the third time in history, receiving 1,551,132 votes (52,99% of the valid votes).

Corruption 
In open inquiry in the Supreme Court (STF), Marconi Perillo is investigated on suspicion of having received R$2 million bribe at the time was governor of the state of Goiás from 1999 to 2006.

References

External links 

 Eleições no Estado de Goiás em 2006
 Vida Política
 Votos - Eleições 1994 Deputado Federal
 Votos - Eleições 1998 - Governador
 Prestação de contas - Eleições 2002 - Governador
 Prestação de contas - Eleições 2006 - Senador
 Relatório das Eleições 2002 -  Vitória sobre Maguito (PDF pág 97)
 Resultado das Eleições 2006 - Senador
 Perfil on Transparência Brasil
 Corruption 2010

1963 births
Governors of Goiás
Living people
People from Goiânia
Brazilian people of Italian descent
Brazilian Democratic Movement politicians
Progressistas politicians
Brazilian Social Democracy Party politicians